The Miss Turkey 2017 held on September 21, 2017 in the Grand Hotel de Pera in Istanbul, Turkey concluded with the crowning of Itır Esen as the Miss World Turkey 2017. Miss Turkey organizers said the 18-year-old Itir Esen was dethroned on Friday, a day after she won the contest and the right to represent Turkey at the Miss World contest in China. The organizers said in an emailed statement that her title was revoked because of a tweet in July that they described as unacceptable. Runner-up Asli Sumen will now represent Turkey in China and also Pınar Tartan who was crowned Miss Supranational Turkey 2017 will now compete at Miss Universe 2017 after this dethroned happened.

Winner and runners-up

Contestants
The official Top 20 Candidates of Miss Turkey 2017:

References

2017 in Turkey
2017 beauty pageants
Beauty pageants in Turkey
Annual events in Turkey